Heavenly bodies may refer to:

Astronomical objects, naturally occurring physical entities that exist in the observable universe
"Heavenly Bodies", a 1982 song by Earl Thomas Conley
 Heavenly Bodies (band), a 1980s English new wave band
Heavenly Bodies (film), a 1985 Canadian film
The Heavenly Bodies (1960s tag team)
The Heavenly Bodies (1990s tag team)